Joe Paul (2 February 1904 – 8 February 1962) was an  Australian rules footballer who played with North Melbourne in the Victorian Football League (VFL).

Notes

External links 

1904 births
1962 deaths
Australian rules footballers from Victoria (Australia)
North Melbourne Football Club players